Solitude (Slovak: Samota) is a painting by Miloš Alexander Bazovský from 1957.

Description
The painting was created in  1957. 
It has the dimensions 54.3 x 84.5 centimeters. 
It is in the collection of the Slovak National Gallery.

Analysis
Bazovský was a modern Slovak painter who portrayed folk life in an iconic style.

References 

1957 paintings
Slovak culture